La Calotte is a French illustrated satirical  anticlerical weekly publication, which appeared in France from 1906 to 1912. Afterwards the title was resumed from 1930 to the present day, with a change of name under the German occupation of France.

La Calotte (1906-1911) 
It was founded in Paris by Louis Grenêche, a publisher, in the context of the 1905 French law on the Separation of the Churches and the State, during the troubles caused by the Inventories. A powerful anticlerical wave then agitated France.

La Calotte appeared every week on 16 pages, half of which was illustrated with anti-clerical satirical drawings. The rest consisted of texts, songs, jokes, denouncing clericalism.

The designers were Saint-Fourien, Asmodée, A. Mac or Chérubin.

In its first issue of 14 September 1906, the editorial explains:

Resumption of title after 1930 
Libertarian activist and free thinker André Lorulot took over this title in the 1930s. The designers who worked there were Armangeol (Armand Gros) who produced comic Bibles, satirical Lives of Jesus and History of the Popes illustrated with satirical drawings.

During the 1939-1945 war, La Calotte changed its title to La Vague, still under the direction of Lorulot, who stigmatized the ties between the Catholic Church and fascism. La Vague denounces antisemitism.

After the war La Calotte became the organ of La Libre Pensee. It was a monthly publication from November 1945 on.

After the death of André Lorulot, H. Perrodo-Le Moyne became its director (May 1963). He writes articles and draws under the signature of P. Le M.

The title still exists on subscription.

La Calotte of Marseille 

Another satirical weekly of the same name was published in Marseilles, between 1897 and 1906, with a pause between 1903 and 1905.

See also 

 Didier Dubucq and his journal Les Corbeaux (1904-1909)
 Anti-clericalism
 Freethought

External links 
 Cartoliste, série du journal La Calotte, cartes postales.
 La Calotte (Paris), Caricatures et caricature, 13 janvier 2007, en ligne.

Bibliography 
 Anne Cachoux, Christian Delporte, La Calotte, mémoire de maîtrise sous la direction de René Rémond, Paris X, Nanterre, 1980
 Guillaume Doizy, À bas la calotte ! La caricature anticléricale et la séparation des Églises et de l’État, Alternatives, 2005, 
 Michel Dixmier, Jacqueline Lalouette, Didier Pasamonik, La République et l’Église. Images d’une querelle, Paris, La Martinière, 2005
 René Rémond, L'Anticléricalisme en France de 1815 à nos jours, Paris, Fayard, 1976, pages 186 et suivantes.

References 

Anarchist periodicals published in France
Satirical magazines published in France
Comics magazines published in France
Magazines established in 1906
Anti-Catholicism in France
1906 establishments in France